Pavel Anatolyevich Novitskiy (born 6 April 1989) is a former Russian professional footballer.

Club career
He made his professional debut in the Russian Second Division in 2007 for FC Nika Moscow.

External links

References

1989 births
Footballers from Chișinău
Living people
Russian footballers
Association football defenders
FC Lokomotiv Moscow players
PFC Krylia Sovetov Samara players
FC Veris Chișinău players
Russian Premier League players
Moldovan Super Liga players
Russian expatriate footballers
Expatriate footballers in Moldova